The Scenery Preservation Act may refer to:

Scenery Preservation Act 1903 in New Zealand
Scenery Preservation Act 1915 in the United States